Paul Gregory Byrd (born December 3, 1970), is an American former professional baseball starting pitcher, who is currently a TV sports broadcaster for Atlanta Braves games on Bally Sports Southeast. Late in his career, he developed an old-fashioned, early twentieth-century windup in which he swung his arms back and forth to create deception and momentum. Byrd became recognizable and well known for his unique delivery.

High school, college and minor leagues
Byrd played his high school career at Saint Xavier High School in Louisville, Kentucky. Byrd attended Louisiana State University where he pitched as part of the Tigers baseball team that won the 1991 College World Series. He was originally drafted in the fourth round of the 1991 Major League Baseball draft by the Cleveland Indians. Byrd spent five years in the minor leagues before being traded to the New York Mets and making his major league debut on July 28, 1995.

Major leagues
As a member of the Philadelphia Phillies, Byrd was selected for the 1999 Major League Baseball All-Star Game. Byrd's career was revived in 2002, when he won 17 games, despite pitching for a Kansas City Royals team that lost 100 games. Byrd parlayed his 2002 season into a two-year free agent contract with the Atlanta Braves. On July 1, 2003, Byrd underwent Tommy John surgery on his right elbow. He was able to successfully come back from the operation and pitch in his first postseason appearance for the Braves during the 2004 National League Division Series.

In December 2004, the Anaheim Angels signed Byrd to a $5 million(USD), one-year contract following the trade of right-handed pitcher Ramón Ortiz to the Cincinnati Reds. Byrd went 12–11 with a 3.74 earned run average in 205 innings with the Angels. He was second in the American League with 21 quality starts.

In 2007, Byrd was 15–8, the third-best record on the Indians behind CC Sabathia and Fausto Carmona.

On October 8, 2007, Byrd was the winning pitcher in a 6–4 win against the New York Yankees, giving the Cleveland Indians a 3–1 series win in the 2007 American League Division Series. Byrd pitched again on October 16, this time against the Boston Red Sox in the ALCS. He went five innings, giving up two earned runs and striking out four, gaining the victory in an Indians 7–3 win to take a 3–1 lead in the best of seven series.

On August 12, 2008, Byrd was traded from the Cleveland Indians to the Boston Red Sox for a player to be named later (Mickey Hall). A free agent at the end of the season, he announced on January 14, 2009, that he would sit out the beginning of the 2009 season to spend more time with his family and likely sign a deal with a contending team midseason. Byrd mentioned he would like to sign with a team that is close to his home in Georgia. On August 5, 2009, the Boston Red Sox signed Byrd to a minor-league contract.  Byrd made his first major league start of the 2009 season for the Red Sox on August 30, 2009, against the Toronto Blue Jays. Byrd went six innings, giving up three hits, three walks and no runs.

Personal
Byrd has written a book called Free Byrd about his life, detailing both his devout Christianity and past struggles with pornography, among other things. Byrd's wife, Kym, is a certified life coach where she helps married athletes with the rigors of their unique marriages. Together, with Paul's help, Kym surveys couples in baseball in hopes of helping those families in need. Through an organization called CRU, Paul and Kym currently travel to various colleges around the United States speaking to students about "Faith in Sports" and "How to Stay Married in a Career Dominated Lifestyle."

HGH controversy
On October 21, 2007, Byrd was accused of using HGH by the San Francisco Chronicle. The paper accused him of spending $24,850 on HGH and syringes from 2002 to 2005. Byrd defended himself, claiming that he was being treated for a tumor on his pituitary gland, and took the drugs under medical supervision. Subsequent news reports assert that Byrd began taking HGH before any pituitary gland condition was diagnosed and that one of the medical professionals to have prescribed Byrd HGH was a Florida dentist whose dental license had been suspended for fraud and incompetence. Rob Manfred, then MLB senior vice president for business and labor, asserted that Byrd did not have a therapeutic use exemption (TUE) as he claimed.

On December 13, 2007, Byrd was cited in the Mitchell Report on illegal use of performance-enhancing substances in baseball.

Broadcasting
As of 2021, Byrd is a TV sports broadcaster with Bally Sports Southeast covering Atlanta Braves games.  He does on-the-field interviews and provides analytical color commentary in tandem with the Braves' play-by-play announcer Chip Caray and Jeff Francoeur.

See also
 List of Major League Baseball players named in the Mitchell Report

References

External links

Paul Byrd at Ultimate Mets Database

1970 births
Living people
New York Mets players
Atlanta Braves players
Philadelphia Phillies players
Kansas City Royals players
Los Angeles Angels players
Cleveland Indians players
Boston Red Sox players
Baseball players from Louisville, Kentucky
LSU Tigers baseball players
Major League Baseball pitchers
National League All-Stars
Kinston Indians players
Canton-Akron Indians players
Charlotte Knights players
Norfolk Tides players
Richmond Braves players
Scranton/Wilkes-Barre Red Barons players
Clearwater Phillies players
Greenville Braves players
Gulf Coast Red Sox players
Pawtucket Red Sox players
Major League Baseball broadcasters
Atlanta Braves announcers